Julio Coll (7 April 1919 – 17 January 1993) was a Spanish screenwriter and film director. He wrote for more than 30 films between 1947 and 1971. In 1972, he was a member of the jury at the 22nd Berlin International Film Festival.

Selected filmography
 The Drummer of Bruch (1948)
 In a Corner of Spain (1949)
 Apartado de correos 1001 (1950)
 Facing the Sea (1951)
 Doubt (1951)
 Forbidden Trade (1952)
 Afternoon of the Bulls (1956)
 Pyro... The Thing Without a Face (1964)
 Aragonese Nobility (1965)
 High Season for Spies (1966)

References

External links

1919 births
1993 deaths
Spanish film directors
Spanish male screenwriters
People from Ripollès
20th-century Spanish screenwriters
20th-century Spanish male writers